The 2014 Texas Tech Red Raiders football team represented Texas Tech University in the 2014 NCAA Division I FBS football season as members of the Big 12 Conference. Kliff Kingsbury lead the Red Raiders in his second season as the program's fifteenth head coach. The Red Raiders played home games on the university's campus in Lubbock, Texas at Jones AT&T Stadium. They finished the season 4–8, 2–7 in Big 12 play to finish in eighth place.

Previous season
Unanimous All-American Jace Amaro was drafted in the 2nd round of the 2014 NFL Draft along with Will Smith who was selected in the 7th. Players Terrance Bullitt, Kerry Hyder, and Eric Ward signed free agent contracts.

Preseason
Quarterback Davis Webb was named as the starter at the position and was selected for the Maxwell Award and Manning Award watch lists. Running back/linebacker Kenny Williams was selected for the Paul Hornung Award watchlist. Placekicker Ryan Bustin was selected for the Lou Groza Award watchlist. Le'Raven Clark was selected for the Outland Trophy and Lombardi Award watchlists, in addition to being selected as a preseason 2nd Team All-American selection by USA Today. Jakeem Grant was named to the Fred Biletnikoff Award watchlist.

As of April 2014, there were 34,100 season tickets were sold for the 2014 season, surpassing the previous season ticket record of 32,227 that were purchased prior to the start of the 2010 season. The Texas Tech athletic department would go on to sell out the stadium through season tickets alone for the 2014 season with a record of 38,502 season tickets purchased.

Coaching changes
 Sonny Cumbie replaced at the co-OC/WR coaches position by Eric Morris.
 Defensive coordinator Matt Wallerstedt resigned following allegations that he was under the influence of an unknown substance following game three. He was replaced by co-DC Mike Smith.

Schedule

Game summaries

Central Arkansas

 
The Texas Tech Red Raiders opened up their 2014 season at home with a 42–35 win over the Central Arkansas Bears. The Red Raiders committed 15 penalties during the game, but still gained a total of 636 yards against the Bears' 406. After two Webb interceptions, the Bears scored to take a 16–7 lead in the 2nd quarter. After receiving an onside kick with 3 minutes left in the game, the Red Raiders held onto the ball to end the game.

Davis Webb threw for 452 yards and four touchdowns during the season opener.

UTEP

Despite only gaining 19 first downs against the Miners' 23 and possessing the ball for 21 minutes, Texas Tech managed to edge out UTEP for a 30–26 win.

Arkansas

The Red Raiders lost their first game of the season against former Southwest Conference rivals, the Arkansas Razorbacks. The Raiders were plagued by both turnovers and penalties and couldn't keep up with Arkansas's run game. Texas Tech was 5–60 on penalties, while Arkansas was only 2–15. The Razorbacks managed to rush for 438 yards, while the Red Raiders only ran for 101.

Oklahoma State

Kansas State

West Virginia

Kansas

TCU

Texas

Sources:

Oklahoma

Sources:

Iowa State

Sources:

Baylor

Sources:

Depth chart

References

Texas Tech
Texas Tech Red Raiders football seasons
Texas Tech Red Raiders football